Huang Ding (Wade–Giles: Huang Ting; ; pinyin: Huáng Dĭng;  – 1730) was a Chinese landscape painter and poet active during the Qing dynasty (1644–1912).

Huang was born in Changshu in the Jiangsu province. His style names was 'Zhungu' and his sobriquets were 'Kuangting, Xianpu, and Du Wangke'. Huang's landscapes were painted in the style of Wang Yuanqi, showing great strength through its imagery. He traveled extensively, and the varied destinations appear in many of his paintings.

References

1650 births
1730 deaths
Qing dynasty landscape painters
Qing dynasty poets
Writers from Suzhou
Poets from Jiangsu
Painters from Suzhou
People from Changshu